Polish Legion in Finland was a military unit made up of ethnic Poles who had been soldiers of the Russian Imperial Army during World War I and stationed in the Grand Duchy of Finland. Created on April 24, 1917, in Viipuri, the unit existed until March 1, 1918. It comprised an infantry battalion in Viipuri, an infantry company in Ino, and a heavy artillery battery in Sveaborg. At its peak, the Legion comprised 37 officers and 1,700 soldiers and was commanded by Captain Stanisław Bogusławski.

The Legion, based in Viipuri, as well as other Finnish towns, such as Helsinki, Ina, Lappeenranta, Tampere, Vaasa, Turku, Oulu, Tornio, Hämeenlinna, Kokemäki, Rauma, Panelia (Kiukainen), Riihimäki, Kotka, Mikkeli, Pori and Hanko, was subordinate to the Government of Finland, and took part in fighting against Red Army troops during the Finnish Civil War, capturing large amounts of equipment, which was handed to the Finnish Army.

Footnotes

References
Polish Legion in Finland, Calendar of the Officer of the Polish Army, 1938
Bulletin of the Union of Poles in Finland
 Venäläissurmat Suomessa 1918-1922 Toim: Lars Westerlund. Helsinki: 2004

See also
 Polnische Wehrmacht
 Blue Army
 First Cadre Company
 Polish Legions (disambiguation)
 Polish 1st Legions Infantry Division
 Polish Legions in World War I

Military units and formations established in 1917
Military units and formations disestablished in 1918
Army units and formations of Finland
Expatriate military units and formations
Military units and formations of Poland in World War I
Polish expatriates in Finland